"La débâcle des sentiments" is a 2007 song recorded by French singer and composer Stanislas, as a duet with Calogero. It was the third single from his debut album L'Équilibre instable on which it appears as fourth track on the first edition of the album and was released on 19 January 2009. It was written by Amaury Salmon and composed by Stanislas. It was successful in France and Belgium (Wallonia) where it hit respectively number two and number three.

Release and music video
Although the song was sent to radio stations on 24 October 2007 and was available digitally since March 2008 (it entered the Belgian chart at No. 33 on 8 March 2008), the song was only released as a CD single on 19 January 2008, because it was scheduled as first single but was cancelled and replaced by "Le Manège. In the second edition of the album, two versions of the song appears : the duet version and a solo version by Stanislas. As sign of popularity, the song and the music video were included on the famous double compilation NRJ Music Awards 2009.

A music video was shot in a retro decor. In it, both singers are participating in a fictitious show called Words & Words (based on the French real game television programme Des chiffres et des lettres) with the radio host Manu Payet portraying the presenter.

Chart performances
In France, the single went straight to number two, on 24 January 2009, with 5,019 units sold, but was unable to dislodge Mikelangelo Loconte's single "Tatoue-moi" which was number-one then. However, the single dropped the weeks after and totalled six weeks in the top ten, 20 weeks in the top 50 and 24 weeks on the chart (top 100).

In Belgium (Wallonia), the single remained in the top 40 for 18 weeks on the Ultratop 50, four of them in the top ten, with a peak at number three on 20 December 2008, thanks to the digital downloads. The single was briefly ranked for two weeks in the Swiss Singles Chart, peaking at number 68 on 14 December 2008.

Track listings
 CD single

 Digital doawload

Charts

Peak positions

End of year charts

References

2007 songs
2008 singles
2009 singles
Calogero (singer) songs
Stanislas (singer) songs
Male vocal duets
Polydor Records singles